Orion was a G & J Burns paddle steamer, built by Caird & Co in 1847, which struck a submerged rock and sank off Portpatrick Lighthouse, Wigtownshire, Scotland, on 18 June 1850 on her way from Liverpool to Glasgow, with the loss of 41 of the 200 passengers on board. The eminent surgeon John Burns was one of the passengers killed in the accident. Among the survivors were John McNeill, who would go on to reach the rank of Major General serving the British Army in India, also winning the Victoria Cross, and his brother Alexander, a future Independent Member of Parliament - though both their parents and two sister perished in the wreck. Some of the survivors were rescued by the Isle of Man vessel Fenella, others by boats from Portpatrick.

Her captain was found guilty of  the "culpable bereavement of the lives of the passengers" and was imprisoned for 18 months. Her second mate was transported.

The incident was described in the 1851 book The wreck of the Orion, a Tribute of Gratitude by Reverend Joseph Clarke, who was one of the survivors.

References

Ships built on the River Clyde
Paddle steamers of the United Kingdom
High Court of Justiciary cases
Shipwrecks of Scotland
History of Dumfries and Galloway
Maritime incidents in June 1850
19th century in Scotland
History of Liverpool
History of Glasgow
1847 ships